Preparatoria Federal (English: Federal Preparatory) is a chain of Mexican high schools (known in Mexico as ) which offers programs to upgrade the regular degree to a technical-professional level. Preparatoria Federal has campuses located in 22 states.

The PFLC and all PREFECO jointly with all CEB high schools are part of the technical school of the DGB, and are dependent of Secretaría de Educación Pública of Mexico.

PREFECO
PREFECO (or Preparatoria Federal por Cooperación English: Cooperation Federal Preparatory) has locations in 22 states. 

Began in the year 1938 as an educational project led by President Lázaro Cárdenas. The PREFECO main feature is their support comes from various organizations and federal, state, municipal, and social organizations primarily interested in the educational development of their community.

PFLC
PFLC or Preparatoria Federal Lázaro Cárdenas (English: Lazaro Cardenas Federal Preparatory School) has a location in the state of Baja California.

Began in October 1946 as a "Cooperation Preparatory". In 1960, the school joins the Autonomous University of Baja California, thus giving rise to the University in the area, without losing its dependence on the SEP. Adopted in 1970 the name "Lazaro Cardenas", and in 1973, was established as a federal school by presidential agreement. Its support is entirely dependent on federal subsidies.

Locations
There are 110 PREFECOs and one PFLC in México.

1 PFLC Aguacaliente (1/1), PFLC Lomas Virreyes (2/1), PFLC Valle Sur (3/1)

See also
PREFECO (Preparatoria Federal por Cooperación)
PFLC (Preparatoria Federal Lázaro Cárdenas)
CEB (Centro de Estudios de Bachillerato)
CBTIS (Centro de Bachillerato Tecnológico Industrial y de Servicios)
CETIS (Centro de Estudios Tecnológicos Industrial y de Servicios)
CBTA (Centro de Bachillerato Tecnológico Agropecuario)
CBTF (Centro de Bachillerato Tecnológico Forestal)
CETMAR (Centro de Estudios Tecnológicos del Mar)
CETAC (Centro de Estudios Tecnológicos en Aguas Continentales)

References

External links
DGB

High schools in Mexico